Maranhão is a northeastern state of Brazil.

Maranhão may also refer to:

Places
 State of Maranhão (colonial), a 17th-18th century administrative division of the Portuguese Empire in South America
 Maranhão Island or São Luís Island, in Brazil
 Maranhão mangroves, a mangrove ecoregion of northern Brazil
 Maranhão River, a river of Goiás state in central Brazil

People
 Maranhão (footballer, 1942-2007), full name José Ribamar Celestino, Brazilian football midfielder
 Maranhão (footballer, born 1985), full name Manoel Messias Barbosa da Silva,Brazilian football right back for Boa Esporte
 Maranhão (footballer, born 1990), full name Francinilson Santos Meirelles, Brazilian football attacking midfielder for Ponte Preta
 Marques do Maranhão (1775–1860), Admiral Thomas Cochrane, 10th Earl of Dundonald, British naval flag officer, mercenary and politician
 Alex Maranhão (born 1985), Brazilian footballer for Criciúma
 Geovane Maranhão (born 1966), Brazilian football striker for Al Hilal EC
 Jefferson Maranhão (born 1993), Brazilian football attacking midfielder for Jacuipense on loan from Santa Cruz
 Joanna Maranhão (born 1987), Brazilian swimmer
 José Maranhão (1933–2021), Brazilian politician, former governor of Paraíba
 Júnior Maranhão (born 1985), Brazilian footballer
 Lúcio Maranhão (born 1988), Brazilian football forward for Elazığspor
 Waldir Maranhão (born 1955), Brazilian politician for the Progressive Party

Other uses
 Maranhão Atlético Clube, a Brazilian football club from São Luís, Maranhão state
 Maranhao hermit, the cinnamon-throated hermit or related birds
 Maranhão red-handed howler, a species of monkey endemic to forests in Brazil
 Maranhão slider, a species of turtle in the family Emydidae
 Marquess of Maranhão, a title of the Earl of Dundonald